End of a Priest is a 1969 Czechoslovak comedy film directed by Evald Schorm. It was entered into the 1969 Cannes Film Festival.

Cast
 Vlastimil Brodský as Verger Albert
 Jan Libíček as Teacher
 Zdena Škvorecká as Anna
 Jana Brejchová as Majka
 Jaroslav Satoranský as Toník
 Vladimír Valenta as Farmer
 Helena Růžičková as Farmer's wife
 Josefa Pechlatová as Grandmother
 Martin Růžek as White bishop
 Gueye Cheick as Black Bishop
 Andrea Čunderlíková as Božka
 Libuše Freslová as Bride
 Václav Kotva as Jan Páně
 Pavel Landovský as Watcher

References

External links
 

1969 films
Czech comedy films
1960s Czech-language films
1969 comedy films
Czechoslovak black-and-white films
Films directed by Evald Schorm
1960s Czech films